Vincent Scotté (born 16 July 1987) is a French footballer who plays as a midfielder for AS Fabrègues. He made 13 appearances in Ligue 2 with AC Ajaccio.

External links
 Vincent Scotté profile at foot-national.com
 
 
 

1987 births
Living people
People from Vincennes
Footballers from Val-de-Marne
French footballers
Association football midfielders
AC Ajaccio players
Villemomble Sports players
Pacy Ménilles RC players
Paris FC players
ES Uzès Pont du Gard players
Les Herbiers VF players
Entente SSG players
FC Fleury 91 players
AC Boulogne-Billancourt players
AS Fabrègues players
Ligue 2 players
Championnat National players
Championnat National 2 players
Championnat National 3 players